David Herrero Llorente (born October 18, 1979 in Bilbao, Basque Country) is a Spanish former professional road bicycle racer, who rode professionally between 2001 and 2009 for the ,  (two spells) and .

Major results
2002
 1st Stage 1 Vuelta a Castilla y León
2003
 1st Stage 1 Vuelta a La Rioja
2004
 1st Prueba Villafranca de Ordizia
 1st Stage 2 Vuelta a Asturias
2005
 1st GP Llodio
 1st Stage 2 Clasica de Alcobendas
 1st Stage 4b (ITT) Euskal Bizikleta
 1st Stage 5 Vuelta a Burgos
2006
 2nd Overall Euskal Bizikleta
1st Stage 5
 3rd Time trial, National Road Championships
2008
 1st Stage 3 Tour of the Basque Country

External links

Cyclists from the Basque Country (autonomous community)
1979 births
Living people
Sportspeople from Bilbao
Spanish male cyclists